Spider is a steel spinning roller coaster made by Maurer Söhne of Germany. The ride is located at the Lagoon Amusement Park in Farmington, Utah. Spider was installed at Lagoon in 2003.
Spider features spinning ride vehicles that can seat two sets of two passengers, facing in opposite directions. The vehicles feature the name of "The Spider and the Fly" for that was what this coaster was going to be named. During development of this ride, the named was shortened to "The Spider" because of unknown reasons. The spinning vehicles were already painted before the name change, thus has the developing name.

In the 2016 season, Spider was repainted and the cement below the coaster was replaced. Its track was repainted red and black as opposed to respectively, pink and purple.

References

Roller coasters in Utah
Lagoon (amusement park)
2003 establishments in Utah